Costin Borc (born 7 May 1965) is a Romanian engineer and economist who was the Deputy Prime Minister and Minister of Economy, Trade and Tourism in the Cioloș Cabinet. He took office on 17 November 2015.

References 

Living people
1965 births
Engineers from Bucharest
21st-century Romanian politicians
Deputy Prime Ministers of Romania
Romanian Ministers of Economy
Politicians from Bucharest